Siuola Simon Lemalu (born 23 January 1981) is a Samoan former rugby union player. He played as a prop.

Career
He debuted in the 2003 Rugby World Cup playing his first cap against Uruguay, at Perth, on 15 October 2003. He played three matches in the tournament. His last cap was against Tonga, at Lautoka, on 13 July 2011. He also played for Northland, Counties Manukau, CA Brive and for Chiefs in the Super Rugby 2008 season. He also played for New Zealand Colts in 2002.

References

External links

Simon S. Lemalu at New Zealand Rugby History

1981 births
Living people
Samoan rugby union players
Samoan expatriate sportspeople in France
Samoan expatriate sportspeople in New Zealand
Rugby union props
Samoa international rugby union players
Samoan expatriate rugby union players
Expatriate rugby union players in France
Expatriate rugby union players in New Zealand
Northland rugby union players
Chiefs (rugby union) players
Counties Manukau rugby union players
CA Brive players